Narwar Fort is situated atop a hill, at Narwar in Shivpuri district of Madhya Pradesh, about 500 feet above ground level spread over an area of 8 km², which stands on a steep scarp of the Vindhya Range. Kachwaha Rajputs  are said to have built (or rebuilt) the fort when they occupied Narwar in the 10th century.  Kachwaha Rajput , Pratihara Rajput , and Tomara Rajputs held Narwar successively from 12th century onwards, until its capture by the Mughals in the 16th century. It was conquered by the Maratha chief Scindia in the early 19th century.

External links 
 

Forts in Madhya Pradesh
Rajput architecture
Tourist attractions in Shivpuri district